The SS Lewiston Victory was a Victory ship built during World War II. It was built in the Oregon Shipbuilding Corporation shipyard in 1944. It served during the Battle of Okinawa as a troop transport. Its hull number was 1202 and MV number 148 and MO/Off. no.: 247076.  Lewiston Victory was converted to a troopship and used to bring troops home as part of Operation Magic Carpet. Lewiston Victory was operated by Pacific-Atlantic Steamship Company under  charter with the Maritime Commission and War Shipping Administration.

The Victory ships were designed to replace the earlier Liberty ships that were designed to be used exclusively for World War II. Victory ships were designed to last longer and serve the US Navy after the war as these were faster, longer, wider, taller, had a thinner stack set farther toward the superstructure, and had a long raised forecastle.

Post war

After the war, it was owned by two merchant shipping companies. In 1947 it was sold to India S.S. Company of Calcutta and renamed SS Indian Merchange, Official number: 174179. In 1972 it was sold to Pent-Ocean Steamships Ltd of Bombay and renamed SS Samuda Sai, Official number: 1257. On September 29, 1977, the ship sank at Tuticorin port anchorage in the Bay of Bengal off India. It was refloated, but was damaged, later it was scrapped at Bombay in October 1977.

See also
List of Victory ships
 Type C1 ship
 Type C2 ship
 Type C3 ship

References

Sources
Sawyer, L.A. and W.H. Mitchell. Victory ships and tankers: The history of the ‘Victory’ type cargo ships and of the tankers built in the United States of America during World War II, Cornell Maritime Press, 1974, 0-87033-182-5.
United States Maritime Commission: 
Victory Cargo Ships 

Victory ships
Ships built in Portland, Oregon
United States Merchant Marine
1944 ships
World War II merchant ships of the United States
Troop ships of the United States